Dinosaurs: Giants of Patagonia is a 2007 film about life in the Early Cretaceous of Patagonia, southern South America. It features paleontologist Rodolfo Coria and his work,  with Donald Sutherland acting as main narrator.

Story 
The movie opens on a scene from approximately 65 million years ago, in the Late Cretaceous. The narrator explains that a massive comet is about to arrive to mark the end of dinosaurs, before taking us back to the Late Jurassic, circa 150 million years ago. From the announced end of the dinosaurs, this time travel serves the purpose of introducing us the biggest creatures to have ever lived on Earth.

We are first introduced to the ocean life of the Late Jurassic period. The first of these is an ichthyosaur, a prehistoric creature resembling a dolphin, with several individuals shown hunting, before one is shown escaping from a Liopleurodon. The movie then takes us to the Early Cretaceous, approximately 90 million years ago.

From this point on, the narrative alternatingly takes us between the work of Rodolfo Coria and the Early Cretaceous. Of all the species of dinosaurs featured, two receive the most focus: the Argentinosaurus and the Mapusaurus. The reason for this focus is easily explained by the fact that those two species are Coria's most important discovery. Of these species, the narrator presents two individuals Strong One (an Argentinosaurus) and Long Tooth (a Mapusaurus).

Strong One is first shown among an Argentinosaurus nest with hatchlings venturing out. The narrator announces that if Strong One survives, he will grow to become one of the largest creatures the Earth has ever known.  Then, depicting just how precarious life was, a Unenlagia arrives and steals an egg, which it runs off with to feast on elsewhere. At this point, we travel back to the present day in order to witness Rodolfo Coria's discovery of Argentinosaurus. The narrator explains that Coria owns his own museum, the Museo Carmen Funes (the museum is featured in the movie as we see Rodolfo Coria in his museum with one of his daughters, as he shows her casts of Argentinosaurus and Giganotosaurus skeletons). We see Coria as he arrives at a digging site with his daughters, where he and his team work on digging out an enormous backbone, which one scientist declares larger than any other bone he had seen. They discover that the bone belonged to a large sauropod. They named it Argentinosaurus, meaning "Argentinian lizard".

Following this, we are shown the discovery of a large theropod. Coria emerges from his car and takes a picture of a dinosaur footprint, then he explains that they found more giant bones first thought to belong to another sauropod, but they were later found out to belong to a new theropod dinosaur they named Giganotosaurus, meaning "giant southern lizard". This leads to a new narrative jump through time, bringing us back to the Early Cretaceous. Unlike the previously featured Argentinosaurus nest, which was left unprotected, a mother giganotosaur is shown guarding her nest from an Unenlagia. The narrator announces that this parental care was only common to theropods. The female manages to drive the threat away, but only one hatchling  hatches: Long Tooth.

The story features both individuals as they grown, highlighting the differences and similarities between both. Strong One as a juvenile is already able to eat from the tops of the trees. Meanwhile, Long Tooth hasn't had much of a growth spurt and is hunting insects. She even eats some vegetation at this age, but as she develops into an adult, plants will be wiped out from the menu. A familiar face by now, an Unenlagia the narrator calls Sharp Feathers, appears to devour an insect Long Tooth had been chasing and she drives him off a cliff. The narrator then explains that even though Sharp Feathers had feathers (as his name indicates) and resembled a bird, he could not fly.

Rodolfo Coria also intervenes to answer a number of questions about the two species, such as whether the giganotosaurins hunted in packs. The narrator explains that they derived this conclusion from research around the site where the Giganotosaurus was discovered, where several Mapusaurus were also found. The viewers are then witness to one of these hunting parties, as we go back to 90 million years B.C. to see Long Tooth fully-grown. She now lives in a pack and is stalking the Argentinosaurus herd. The victim chosen is Strong One and he gets wounded, but stands back and stops the pack from hunting. One of them is killed in the process and, displaying the cruelty of life, is eaten by Long Tooth and the others. A Unenlagia briefly interrupts, but is scared off by the giganotosaurs.

The movie then comes full circle, as it goes back to the  Late Cretaceous we were shown in the introduction, more precisely in North America where we are introduced to the Quetzalcoatlus, a pterosaur capable of flight with wings of a diameter of over 12 meters. As announced, the end of the dinosaurs comes to be and the comet crashes on Earth, killing a Tyrannosaurus rex on screen. The after effects of the crash are explained through a scene featuring the changing scenery as a small group of Argentinosaurus progresses through the land. Eventually, as snow starts to fall and the trees are shown to be bare, one sauropod collapses and the viewer understands that this is the end of all dinosaurs.

The movie also covers various theories regarding the Origin of Birds, explaining that some dinosaurs have evolved to become the birds that we know today.

Featured genera and species 
 Anabisetia (unidentified)
 Anhanguera (unidentified)
 Argentinosaurus
 Gasparinisaura (unidentified)
 Giganotosaurus
 Liopleurodon
 Mapusaurus
 Ophthalmosaurus (unidentified)
 Pterodaustro (unidentified)
 Quetzalcoatlus
 Tyrannosaurus rex 
 Unenlagia

Characters 
 Strong One: a large male Argentinosaurus, He smacks and crushes one of the member of Long Tooth's family for defence himself in the last battle. He will reach maturity at 20 years old, and will be 120 feet long which longer than a blue whale and weigh over hundred tons. But he's only at the beginning of more than centuries life, he will keep on growing all of his life at a lower pace that in his earlier few decades. His length will finally reaching at least few times bigger than his earlier centuries, when he's magnificent dusk arrivals.
 Long Tooth: a female Giganotosaurus which discovered to be a Mapusaurus for sure before she attack Strong One with her family in the last battle. Although there is such body mass, but she's still relatively agile. Also, some expert believe that she could reach 30 kilometers per hour.
 Tyrannosaurus: a male Tyrannosaurus rex  killed by the comet crashing into Earth, he seems to be the first one killed by the impact of his kind.
 Liopleurodon: a clade of short-necked plesiosaurs which is the top of the food chain in Late Jurassic ocean, they are also one of the worst terror nightmares for every marine animal in the Jurassic ocean.

In popular culture 
In 2009, the Quebec City Maison Hamel-Bruneau museum featured an exhibition displaying models created for the purpose of the movie, several fossils (including dinosaur cranium molds) and clips from the movie. The exhibition served to display the bridge between the work of paleontologists and the creation of a 3D movie featuring digitally created dinosaurs.

Crew 
 Director: Marc Fafard
 Writer: Marc Fafard
 Narrator: Donald Sutherland

References

External links
 
 

2007 films
Canadian documentary films
English-language Canadian films
Documentary films about dinosaurs
2007 3D films
2007 documentary films
3D short films
Films set in Argentina
2000s English-language films
2000s Canadian films